Vanguard Military School is a co-educational school located on the North Shore of Auckland, New Zealand. Serving years 11 to 13, the school was one of five new government partnership (charter) schools being implemented across New Zealand in 2014. It transitioned into a state designated character school in 2019.

History 

Vanguard Military School opened in February 2014 as one of the Fifth National Government's new partnership schools. It is a senior secondary school that catered for year 11 and 12 students in its foundation year before expanding to take year 13 students in 2015.

Following the election of the Sixth Labour Government in October 2017, the partnership school model was disestablished.  Vanguard subsequently opted to become a section 156 designated character state school starting in the 2019 school year.

References

External links 

Schools in Auckland
2014 establishments in New Zealand
Educational institutions established in 2014
Military schools